The 1989 Davis Cup World Group Qualifying Round was held from 20 to 24 July. They were the main play-offs of the 1989 Davis Cup. The winners of the playoffs advanced to the 1990 Davis Cup World Group, and the losers were relegated to their respective Zonal Regions I.

Teams
Bold indicates team had qualified for the 1990 Davis Cup World Group.

From World Group

 
 
 
 
 
 
 
 

 From Americas Group I

 
 

 From Asia/Oceania Group I

 
 

 From Europe/Africa Group I

Results summary
Date: 20–24 July

The eight losing teams in the World Group first round ties and eight winners of the Zonal Group I final round ties competed in the World Group Qualifying Round for spots in the 1990 World Group.

Qualifying results

Great Britain vs. Argentina

Peru vs. Australia

Denmark vs. Italy

New Zealand vs. Hungary

Netherlands vs. Indonesia

South Korea vs. Israel

Mexico vs. Soviet Union

Switzerland vs. Paraguay

References

External links
Davis Cup Official Website

World Group Qualifying Round